Just William is a British television series based on the Just William series of books written by Richmal Crompton. It ran for two series from 1994 to 1995 on BBC. The series starred Oliver Rokison as William and Jonathan Hirst as Ginger.

Cast
Oliver Rokison as William
Jonathan Hirst as Ginger
Stephen Willmott as Henry
Alastair Weller as Douglas
Tiffany Griffiths as Violet Elizabeth Bott
Polly Adams as Mrs. Brown
David Horovitch as Mr. Brown
Rebecca Johnson as Ethel Brown
Ben Pullen as Robert Brown
Naomi Allisstone as Ellen the Maid

Episodes

Series One

The first series consisted of six episodes.

 "William and the Russian Prince"
 "William's Busy Day"
 "William – The Great Actor"
 "William and the White Elephants"
 "Finding a School for William"
 "William's Birthday"

Series Two

The second series also consisted of six episodes.

 "William Clears The Slums"
 "Parrots for Ethel"
 "Boys Will Be Boys"
 "William and the Ebony Hair Brush"
 "William and the Old Man in the Fog"
 "William Turns Over a New Leaf"

Although each episode bears the name of the short story it is based on, some episodes included material from other short stories in order to provide fuller stories for each episode.

References

External links

1990s British children's television series
1994 British television series debuts
1995 British television series endings
BBC children's television shows
Just William
Television shows based on children's books